Schöckl Transmitter is a facility for FM- and TV-transmission on the Schöckl Mountain in Steiermark, Austria. It uses as an antenna tower, a 100-metre-high lattice tower, which was built in 1956.

The tower of Schöckl transmitter was originally completely free-standing, but it was in recent times additionally guyed.

References
http://www.wabweb.net/radio/frames/radioaf5.htm

External links 
 Pictures of transmitting site Schöckl

Radio masts and towers in Europe
Towers in Austria
Buildings and structures in Styria
Graz Highlands